George Riley may refer to:

 George Riley (British Columbia politician) (1843–1916), Canadian merchant and Liberal politician
 George Riley (Nova Scotia politician) (1922–2002), member of the Nova Scotia House of Assembly
 George Riley (baseball) (born 1956), former Major League Baseball pitcher
 George R. Riley (1899–1983), World War I flying ace
 George Riley (broadcaster) (born 1978), British sports broadcaster
 George Riley (abolitionist) (1833–1905)

See also
George Reilly (born 1957), Scottish footballer
George O'Reilly (1911–1992), Canadian politician